Sturt (The Sturt until 1875) was an electoral district of the House of Assembly in the Australian state of South Australia. It was named after the explorer Charles Sturt.

Sturt was one of the initial districts in the first parliament. It was initially centred on Unley, but later broadened to include all or part of Belair, Brighton, Glenelg, Goodwood, Hyde Park, Mitcham, Parkside and Sturt. When recreated in 1915, it also included Hawthorn and Wayville.

Members

References

Former electoral districts of South Australia
1857 establishments in Australia
1915 establishments in Australia
1902 disestablishments in Australia
1938 disestablishments in Australia